In mathematics, Chrystal's equation is a first order nonlinear ordinary differential equation, named after the mathematician George Chrystal, who discussed the singular solution of this equation in 1896. The equation reads as

This equation is a generalization of Clairaut's equation since it reduces to Clairaut's equation under certain condition as given below.

Solution

Introducing the transformation  gives

Now, the equation is separable, thus

If , the solution is

where  is an arbitrary constant. If , then the solution is

When one of the roots is zero, the equation reduces to Clairaut's equation and a parabolic solution is obtained in this case,  and the solution is

The above family of parabolas are enveloped by the parabola , therefore this enveloping parabola is a singular solution.

References

Equations of physics
Ordinary differential equations